Laim (Central Bavarian: Loam) is a district of Munich, Germany, forming the 25th borough of the city. Inhabitants: c. 49.000 (2005)

History

Originally its own independent locality, Laim was in existence before Munich. It was first documented between 1047 and 1053 as loco leima (in Leim village). The municipality was formed in 1818 and consolidated into Munich on 1 January 1900. At that time the village centre was Laim meadow, which was inaugurated on its return to the people on 1 and 2 July 2000, with festivities celebrating the 100 year incorporation of Laim into Munich. Opposite the meadow is the Catholic St. Ulrich-Kirche (St. Ulrich's Church). The name Leim comes from the German word Lehm meaning clay and Lehmboden meaning clay soil. Earlier Laim used the 21 series post code, however nowadays the codes 80686 - 80689 are utilised.

Laim is not to be confused with Berg am Laim, the 14th borough of Munich 10 km away to the east.

Boroughs of Munich